Gaspar "Indio" Ortega (born October 31, 1935) was a Mexican professional boxer and is considered one of the best Welterweight boxers from Mexico.

Pro career
In January 1953, Ortega was only seventeen years old when he won his pro debut against Miguel Ocana in San Luis Río Colorado, Sonora, Mexico.

On June 3, 1961 Gaspar lost to Emile Griffith, the bout would be his first shot at a World Championship.

Retirement
In 1995 Ortega was elected into the World Boxing Hall of Fame.

Footnotes

Further reading

 Troy Rondinone, Friday Night Fighter: Gaspar "Indio" Ortega and the Golden Age of Television Boxing. Urbana, IL: University of Illinois Press, 2013.

External links

Boxers from Baja California
Sportspeople from Mexicali
Mexican people of indigenous peoples descent
Welterweight boxers
1935 births
Living people
Mexican male boxers